Saulius Skvernelis (born 23 July 1970) is a Lithuanian politician who served as prime minister of Lithuania between 2016 and 2020. He is currently a member of the Seimas. Previously he served as police commissioner, and was Minister of the Interior from 2014 to 2016. His premiership included creation of Child benefit, wage and pensions increase and income tax cuts. Skvernelis Cabinet teachers pay reform led to the biggest teachers strike in Lithuania's history. His Government had also introduced measures that reduced freedom of press. Skvernelis is considered of being pragmatic politician (opportunist by his critics) who doesn't have a clear political ideology.

Education and work 
Born in Kaunas, Skvernelis graduated from the Vilnius Technical University in 1994 and started working at the Lithuania Police Academy.

In 1998, Skvernelis started his career in the Lithuanian law enforcement system, working as a traffic police inspector in Trakai District Municipality. Gradually rising through the ranks, he became the general commissioner of the Lithuanian police on 7 March 2011.

General Commissioner 
On 25 February 2011, Skvernelis was assigned as the General Commissioner of Police of Lithuania. He was heavily criticised in 2012, while implementing court ruling, police transferred a girl back to the custody of her biological mother with the help of 240 police officers. Earlier the girl had been testifying against the mother in a pedophilia case, which created big tensions in the society.

Political career 
On 5 November 2014, President Dalia Grybauskaitė appointed Skvernelis as Minister of the Interior, with the Seimas confirming the appointment on 11 November. Skvernelis replaced Dailis Alfonsas Barakauskas in the role. He was nominated for the position by Order and Justice, which was part of the ruling coalition, despite not being a member of the party.

During 2015 and 2016, Skvernelis became one of the most popular politicians in Lithuania. In March 2016, Skvernelis announced he would participate in the October 2016 elections to the Seimas on the electoral list of Lithuanian Farmers and Greens Union, a party with only one seat in the outgoing parliament. As a result, he was forced to resign as the Minister of the Interior, to be replaced by Tomas Žilinskas.

Although not a member of the party, Skvernelis headed the electoral list of the Farmers and Greens, leading them to a surprisingly large victory in the 2016 election. The party won 22.45% of votes in the nationwide constituency (finishing close second to the Homeland Union), but finished with 54 of the 141 seats in the Seimas, thanks to solid performances in single-member constituencies. Skvernelis was elected to the Seimas in the single-member constituency of Karoliniškės in Vilnius.

In the subsequent coalition negotiations between Farmers and Greens and the Social Democratic Party of Lithuania, it was agreed that Skvernelis would become the Prime Minister of Lithuania. He was appointed as Prime Minister by President Dalia Grybauskaitė on 22 November 2016, having been confirmed by the Seimas, and assumed the office on 13 December 2016, when the Seimas approved the program of the Skvernelis Cabinet.

The coalition government between the Lithuanian Farmers and Greens Union and the Social Democratic Party of Lithuania collapsed in autumn of 2017, reducing the Skvernelis government to a minority, but some Social Democrat Seimas members disagreed with the decision to leave the coalition and allied with Lithuanian Farmers and Greens Union. Later, the Lithuanian Social Democratic Labour Party was formed.

On 14 February 2018, appearing at an LGBT rally in Vilnius, Skvernelis called on the Seimas to recognise same-sex partnerships.

On 17 January 2019, Skvernelis announced his candididacy for the presidency. In the first round of the presidential election he came third. After his poor showing Skvernelis announced that he would resign from position of Prime Minister, but later retracted his remarks.

Skvernelis remained the Prime Minister until the 2020 election, when the Lithuanian Farmers and Greens-led coalition lost to the Homeland Union.

In March 2021 the Lithuanian Farmers and Greens Union and the Labour Party signed a coalition agreement that gave the needed number of members of Seimas for the parties to appoint the opposition leader to the Seimas' Board. On 25 March 2021 Skvernelis was appointed to this position. He remained in this position until mid-september 2021.

In late 2021, Skvernelis left the Lithuanian Farmers and Greens Union political group in Seimas and formed political group Democrats "For Lithuania".

On 29 January 2022 he has formed his own party Union of Democrats "For Lithuania" and was elected its first chairman.

Honours

Foreign honours
 : Grand Cross of the Order of Merit of the Republic of Poland (15 July 2019)

References

External links
 

1970 births
Living people
21st-century Lithuanian politicians
Lithuanian police officers
Members of the Seimas
Ministers of Internal Affairs of Lithuania
Politicians from Kaunas
Prime Ministers of Lithuania
Independent politicians in Lithuania